The 2015–16 season was Zavrč's 3rd season in the Slovenian PrvaLiga, the top Slovenian division, since the league was created.

Players
As of 1 March 2016

Source:NK Zavrč

Competitions

PrvaLiga

League table

Results summary

Results by round

Matches

PrvaLiga play-off

First leg

Second leg

Note: Zavrč won the play-off fixture against Aluminij Kidričevo with the score 4–3 on aggregate but the club was unsuccessful in obtaining a licence to play in the top division for the next season, due to financial reasons.

Cup

First round

Round of 16

Quarter-finals

Semi-finals

Statistics

See also

2015–16 Slovenian PrvaLiga
2015–16 Slovenian Football Cup

References

External links
Official website 
PrvaLiga profile 
Facebook profile
Twitter profile
Soccerway profile

Slovenian football clubs 2015–16 season